The .25-21 Stevens was an American centerfire rifle cartridge.

Designed by Capt. W. L. Carpenter, 9th U.S. Infantry, in 1897, the .25-21 was based on the longer .25-25. It was Stevens' second straight-cased cartridge (after the .25-25) and would be used in the single shot Model 44 rifle, as well as the Model , which first went on sale in 1903. In addition, it was available in the Remington-Hepburn target rifle.

While the .25-25 was popular, the .25-21 offered "practically the same performance and was a little cleaner shooting."

In power, the .25-21 was outpaced by the .25-20 Winchester and .32-20 Winchester, while today, even modern pistol rounds such as the .38 Super offer superior performance.

Notes

Sources
Barnes, Frank C., ed. by John T. Amber. ".25-21 Stevens", in Cartridges of the World, pp. 74 & 123. Northfield, IL: DBI Books, 1972. .
__ and _. ".25-25 Stevens", in Cartridges of the World, p. 75. Northfield, IL: DBI Books, 1972. .
__ and _. ".25-20 WCF", in Cartridges of the World, p. 20. Northfield, IL: DBI Books, 1972. .
__ and _. ".32-20 Winchester", in Cartridges of the World, p. 46. Northfield, IL: DBI Books, 1972. .
__ and _. ".38 Colt Super Automatic", in Cartridges of the World, p. 46. Northfield, IL: DBI Books, 1972. .

Pistol and rifle cartridges
Stevens Arms